is a retired Japanese mixed martial artist who competed in the Strawweight divisions of Shooto and Road Fighting Championship. He is the former Shooto Flyweight (114 lb, 52 kg) Champion.

Fight Matrix ranks him as the fifth greatest strawweight in mixed martial arts history.

Mixed martial arts career

Early career
Yamagami made his professional debut on August 3, 2008, at Shooto: Gig Central 15, against Hiroyuki Kondo, in the Shooto Flyweight Rookie Tournament quarterfinals. He won the fight by majority decision. After beating Yusuke Sato at Shooto: Shooting Disco 6: Glory Shines In You by a second-round knockout, Yamagami was scheduled to fight Junji Ito at Shooto: The Rookie Tournament 2008 Final in the Rookie Tournament finals. Yamagami won the fight by a guillotine choke midway through the second round.

After losing his next two fights to Atsushi Takeuchi and Takehiro Ishii by decision and submission respectively, Yamagami rebounded with a unanimous decision win against Takehiro Harusaki at Shooto: Gig Saitama 2.

Shooto title reign
Following two more decision wins against the future Shooto Flyweight champion Shinya Murofushi and against Atsushi Takeuchi, Yamagami was given the chance to fight Junji Ikoma for the Shooto World Flyweight (114 lb) Championship, at Shooto: Shooto the Shoot 2011. Yamagami won the title by a first round stoppage, knocking Ikoma out after just 41 seconds.

Yamagami was scheduled to make his first title defense at Shooto - 10th Round, in a rematch with Junji Ito. Yamagami won the fight by a second-round rear-naked choke.

Nine months after his first title defense, Yamagami was scheduled to fight Mamoru Yamaguchi at Vale Tudo Japan - VTJ 1st. He won the fight by majority decision.

Later career
Yamagami was next scheduled to fight Narongchai Dragontail at HEAT 29, on December 15, 2013. He won the fight by a first-round TKO.

Yamagami fought outside of Japan for the first time at Road FC 14, when he was scheduled to meet Nam Jin Jo. He lost the fight by unanimous decision.

Yamagami was scheduled to fight Jae Nam Yoo at Road FC 20. He lost the fight by unanimous decision.

Championships and accomplishments

Mixed martial arts
Shooto
Shooto World Flyweight (114 lb) Championship 
One successful title defense
Shooto 2008 Flyweight (114 lb) rookie championship

Mixed martial arts record

|-
|  Loss
| align=center| 10–4
| Jae Nam Yoo
| Decision (unanimous)
| Road FC 20
| 
| align=center| 2
| align=center| 3:00
| Seoul, South Korea
| 
|-
|  Loss
| align=center| 10–3
| Nam Jin Jo
| Decision (unanimous)
| Road FC 14
| 
| align=center| 3
| align=center| 5:00
| Seoul, South Korea
| 
|-
|  Win
| align=center| 10–2
| Narongchai Dragontail
| TKO (punches)
| Heat - Heat 29
| 
| align=center| 1
| align=center| 2:53
| Tokyo, Japan
| 
|-
|  Win
| align=center| 9–2
| Mamoru Yamaguchi
| Decision (majority)
| Vale Tudo Japan - VTJ 1st
| 
| align=center| 3
| align=center| 5:00
| Tokyo, Japan
| 
|-
| Win
| align=center| 8–2
| Junji Ito
| Technical Submission (rear-naked choke)
| Shooto - 10th Round
| 
| align=center| 2
| align=center| 1:36
| Tokyo, Japan
| 
|-
| Win
| align=center| 7–2
| Junji Ikoma
| KO (punch)
| Shooto: Shooto the Shoot 2011
| 
| align=center| 1
| align=center| 0:41
| Tokyo, Japan
| 
|-
| Win
| align=center| 6–2
| Atsushi Takeuchi
| Decision (unanimous)
| Shooto: Shooto Tradition 2011
| 
| align=center| 3
| align=center| 5:00
| Tokyo, Japan
| 
|-
| Win
| align=center| 5–2
| Shinya Murofushi
| Decision (majority)
| Shooto: The Way of Shooto 6: Like a Tiger, Like a Dragon
| 
| align=center| 2
| align=center| 5:00
| Tokyo, Japan
| 
|-
| Win
| align=center| 4–2
| Takehiro Harusaki
| Decision (unanimous)
| Shooto: Gig Saitama 2
| 
| align=center| 2
| align=center| 5:00
| Saitama, Japan
| 
|-
| Loss
| align=center| 3–2
| Takehiro Ishii
| Technical Submission (americana)
| Shooto: Gig Saitama 1
| 
| align=center| 1
| align=center| 4:21
| Saitama, Japan
| 
|-
| Loss
| align=center| 3–1
| Atsushi Takeuchi
| Decision (unanimous)
| Shooto: Kitazawa Shooto 2009 Vol. 1
| 
| align=center| 2
| align=center| 5:00
| Tokyo, Japan
| 
|-
| Win
| align=center| 3–0
| Junji Ito
| Submission (guillotine choke)
| Shooto: The Rookie Tournament 2008 Final
| 
| align=center| 2 
| align=center| 2:15
| Tokyo, Japan
| 
|-
| Win
| align=center| 2–0
| Yusuke Sato
| KO (punch)
| Shooto: Shooting Disco 6: Glory Shines In You
| 
| align=center| 2  
| align=center| 0:18
| Tokyo, Japan
| 
|-
| Win
| align=center| 1–0
| Hiroyuki Kondo
| Decision (majority)
| Shooto: Gig Central 15
| 
| align=center| 2 
| align=center| 5:00
| Aichi, Japan
|

See also
 List of male mixed martial artists

References

External links

1987 births
Living people
Japanese male mixed martial artists
Strawweight mixed martial artists
Mixed martial artists utilizing kickboxing
Sportspeople from Saitama Prefecture
Shooto